Raphiglossa is an African and Palearctic genus of potter wasps.

References

Biological pest control wasps
Potter wasps
Taxa named by William Wilson Saunders
Hymenoptera genera